Hopewell is an unincorporated community in Lamar County, Texas, United States. It lies at an elevation of 551 feet (168 m).

References

Unincorporated communities in Lamar County, Texas
Unincorporated communities in Texas